Runners is a 1983 film written by Stephen Poliakoff, and directed by Charles Sturridge. It stars Kate Hardie, James Fox and Jane Asher.

Premise

An English father heads for London in search of his missing teenage daughter.

Cast
Kate Hardie as Rachel Lindsay
James Fox as Tom Lindsay
Jane Asher as Helen
Eileen O'Brien as Gillian Lindsay
Bernard Hill as Trevor Field

Box office
Goldcrest Films invested £721,000 in the film and earned £401,000 causing them to lose £320,000.

References

External links

1983 films
Films scored by George Fenton
Films directed by Charles Sturridge
British drama films
1983 drama films
1980s English-language films
1980s British films